HNI Corporation is one of the largest office furniture manufacturers in the world in regard to revenues resulting from office segment sales. HNI is also the world's leading hearth products company, manufacturing and marketing gas, electric, wood and biomass burning fireplaces, inserts, stoves, facings and accessories. The company was founded in 1944 by engineer C. Maxwell Stanley, advertising executive Clem Hanson, and industrial designer H. Wood Miller. Its headquarters are in Muscatine, Iowa, with operations located in Muscatine, in various other U.S. states, and in Asia. 
 
HNI's office furniture brands include The HON Company, Allsteel, Gunlocke, Maxon, HBF, OFM, and Lamex. The corporation's hearth brands, manufactured by Hearth & Home Technologies and offered through multiple retail and new construction channels, include Heatilator, Heat & Glo, Harman, Quadra-Fire, Majestic, Monessen, Fireside Hearth & Home, and Vermont Castings.

Awards 
America's Most Admired Companies, 2006 Fortune magazine
400 Best Big Companies in America, 1998-2006 Forbes magazine
50 Best Manufacturing Companies, 2002-2006 IndustryWeek
America's Top 100 Most Trustworthy Companies, 2016-2017 Forbes magazine
World's Best Companies for Leadership Development, 2014–2016, Chief Executive magazine

Further reading

References

External links

Furniture companies of the United States
Companies listed on the New York Stock Exchange
Manufacturing companies established in 1944
Companies based in Muscatine, Iowa
American companies established in 1944
Manufacturing companies based in Iowa
1944 establishments in Iowa